Baiocchi is a surname of Italian origin. Notable people with the surname include:

Claudio Baiocchi (1940–2020), Italian mathematician
Hugh Baiocchi (born 1946), South African professional golfer
Regina Harris Baiocchi (born 1956), American musician, music educator, composer and writer

Italian-language surnames